Kyōbashi may refer to:

 Kyōbashi, Tokyo
 Kyōbashi Station (Osaka), in Osaka
 Kyōbashi Station (Tokyo), in Tokyo